Keightley is an English surname.

Notable people named Keightley
Archibald Keightley (1859–1930), member of the Theosophical Society.
Bill Keightley (1926–2008), equipment manager for the University of Kentucky men's basketball team
Charles Keightley (1901–1974), British general
David Keightley (1932-2017), historian of early China
Edwin W. Keightley (1843–1926), US politician
Lisa Keightley (born 1971), Australian cricketer
Thomas Keightley (historian) (1789–1872), historian
Thomas Keightley (official) (1650–1719), official in Ireland
Archibald Keightley Nicholson (1871–1937), stained glass maker

References